Othellos Athienou is a football club based in Athienou, Larnaca, Cyprus and competes in the Cypriot Second Division. The football department is the only activity of the club at the moment, which participated for the first time in the Cypriot First Division, the top football level division in Cyprus. The club colours are green and white.

History 
Othellos was founded in 1933.  The club colours are green and white and they play in Othellos Athienou Stadium.  In 1967, the club joined the Cyprus Football Association (CFA) and since then has participated regularly in the all championships of the Association.

Othellos from its foundation has demonstrated "rich" athletic and social activity. From 1987, Othellos is accommodated in its privately owned residence. In 2003 the club acquired the ownership of its football ground.

Players

For recent transfers, see List of Cypriot football transfers summer 2021.

Out on loan

Achievements 
 Cypriot Third Division Winners: 2
 1990–91, 1993–94
 Cypriot Fourth Division Winners: 1
 2004

References

External links 
 Othellos Official Website
 CFA Official Website

Football clubs in Cyprus
Association football clubs established in 1933
1933 establishments in Cyprus
 
Football clubs in Larnaca